Julia Wu (born 6 October 1994) is a Chinese Australian R&B singer based in Taiwan.

Early life and education 
Wu grew up in Brisbane, Australia. She graduated from the Berklee College of Music in 2015, majoring in piano.

Musical career 
Wu began classical piano training at an early age. In 2014, she garnered recognition for her performance in the sixth season of The X Factor. She starred in the CJ E&M variety show "Miss Korea: Julia & Jojo" alongside Jojo Hung in 2015. In 2017, Wu debuted with the English language EP @henry, and released her debut Mandarin single "Under the Stars."

Discography 

 1:28 (2017)
 1994 is Still Old (2018)
 5am (2019)
 2622 (2021)

References

External links 

 

Living people
21st-century Taiwanese women singers
Australian people of Chinese descent
Berklee College of Music alumni
1994 births
Australian women singers
Australian expatriates in Taiwan
The X Factor (Australian TV series) contestants
Musicians from Brisbane